The Women's Singles tournament of the 2007 Open Gaz de France tennis championships took place in Paris, France, between 5 February and 11 February 2007. 27 players from 15 countries competed in the 5-round tournament, with the three highest-seed players joining in the second round of competition. The final winner was Nadia Petrova of Russia, who defeated Lucie Šafářová of the Czech Republic.

Prelude
5 February 2007 – Elena Bovina withdrew from the Open Gaz de France due to a nerve entrapment.  In the single's draw she was replaced by the lucky loser, Agnieszka Radwańska, and in the doubles draw she and her partner, Anna Chakvetadze, were replaced by the alternate team of Stéphanie Foretz and Camille Pin.
27 January 2007 – Kim Clijsters withdrew from the Open Gaz de France to allow for one week's rest in order to treat hip pain.

Seeds
The seeded players are listed below. Players are listed with the round in which they exited.

Draw

Key
 Q = Qualifier
 WC = Wild card
 LL = Lucky loser

Finals

Top half

Bottom half

Notes
The winner will receive $88,265 and 275 ranking points.
The runner-up will receive $47,125 and 190 ranking points.
The last direct acceptance was Lucie Šafárová (ranked 42nd).
The Players' Representatives were Amélie Mauresmo and Nicole Vaidišová.

Singles 2007
Open Gaz de France